The 2003–04 international cricket season lasted from September 2003 to March 2004.

Season overview

Pre-season rankings
The following are the rankings at the start of the season.

October

South Africa in Pakistan

New Zealand in India

Zimbabwe in Australia

England in Bangladesh

TVS Cup (India, Australia, New Zealand in India)

November

West Indies in Zimbabwe

England in Sri Lanka

New Zealand in Pakistan

December

India in Australia

West Indies in South Africa

Pakistan in New Zealand

January

VB Series (AUS, IND, ZIM in AUS)

West Indies in South Africa

February

Bangladesh in Zimbabwe

South Africa in New Zealand

The two abandoned ODI matches at Dunedin and Auckland were played the day after at the same venue. The ODI series was still revised to a six-game series

Australia in Sri Lanka

March

England in West Indies

India in Pakistan

2003–04 Americas Affiliates Championship

2004 ICC Intercontinental Cup

Group stage

Finals

References

External links
2004 season on ESPN Cricinfo

2004 in cricket
2003 in cricket